The 1946–47 Copa México was the 31st staging of the Copa México, the 4th staging in the professional era.

The competition started on June 15, 1947, and concluded on July 3, 1947, with the final, in which Moctezuma de Orizaba lifted the trophy for the second time with a 4–3 victory over Club Deportivo Oro.

This edition was played by 15 teams, in a knock-out stage, in a single match.

First round

Played on June 15

|}

Bye:  Marte

Play-off

Played on June 17

|}

Quarterfinals

Played on June 22

|}

Semifinals

Played on June 26

|}

Play-off

Played on June 29

|}

Final

Played on July 3

|}

References
Mexico - Statistics of Copa México in season 1946/1947. (RSSSF)

1946-47
Cup
1946–47 domestic association football cups